Stephanie G. Ovadia is a New York State attorney and a radio show host.

Education
Stephanie Ovadia received a B.A. in Political Science from Binghamton University in 1980. She obtained a paralegal program certificate from Adelphi University in 1981. In 1984, she received her J.D. from the Southwestern University School of Law.

Career

Ovadia started practising after earning her law degree. In 1993, she founded the Law Office of Stephanie G. Ovadia, where she is currently practising as a licensed New York State attorney. Her law office is located in South Hempstead in New York, previously located in East Meadow.

Radio Show

Ovadia hosts her own radio show, the Stephanie O Show, on 103.9 FM, LI News Radio in the New York area. She is the co-host of this show with Adriane Schwartz. The celebrity news and talk radio show broadcast live on Wednesday from 10 pm to 11 pm and replayed every Sunday from 5 pm to 6 pm.

In Media

Ovadia has appeared as a legal commentator on FOX 5. She has been in several print publications including the New York Times, TMZ, Newsday, CNBC, the New York Post, and NY Daily News.

References

External links
 Stephanieovadia.com
 Lawofficestephanieovadia.com

American lawyers
Living people
Binghamton University alumni
Year of birth missing (living people)